Rayo was an 80-gun ship of the line of the Spanish Navy. She underwent rebuilding at Cartagena from 1803 to 1805, emerging as a three-decked ship with 100 guns. She then fought at the Battle of Trafalgar during the Napoleonic Wars and was dismasted as a result of damage sustained in the battle. Subsequently, she ran aground and was wrecked in a storm. Her broken hull was set ablaze and destroyed by British sailors on 31 October.

Service

Early
Construction on Rayo started in 1747 in Havana, Cuba, alongside her sister ship Fénix and was launched in the summer of 1749. She was commissioned in January 1751, but was unable to leave port for the lack of crew. It took another year to find the enough men to sail her. She remained in Cadiz for further outfits.

In 1765, under the command of Captain Don José de Rojas Recaño, Rayo was assigned to the fleet under the command of Admiral Don Juan José de Navarro Viana y Búfalo, the 1st Marqués de la Victoria. The fleet was made up of Rayo, Arrogante, Triunfante, Atlante, Galicia, Princesa, Guerrero , Velasco, Poderoso, two chambequines and five minor vessels. The fleet sailed from Cádiz on 17 May. After briefly stopping at Cartagena, it sailed on to Genoa, arriving on 17 July to drop off the infanta Doña Luisa María Teresa de Parma, daughter of Felipe I de Parma and pick up the Princess Maria Luisa of Spain, daughter of King Carlos III. The fleet returned to Cartagena on 11 August where it dropped off the infanta Doña Luisa María Teresa de Parma and the Marques of la Victoria, Juan José de Navarro Viana y Búfalo. Command was then handed over to Admiral Don Luis de Córdova y Córdova. A smaller fleet was formed, sailing from Cartagena on 23 August, consisting of Rayo, Princesa and Guerrero which was tasked with escorting two tartanes and a saetía back to Cádiz.

In 1769, Rayo was disarmed and stationed at Cádiz under the command of Captain Don Pedro Moyano who was charged with the ship's preservation. Between February and April 1769, the ship was careened and refitted

Rebuild
In 1803 Rayo was taken into Cartagena Dockyard where she underwent rebuilding by Honorato Bouyon, emerging with a complete third deck linking her quarterdeck and forecastle, and consequently carrying an enhanced ordnance of 100 guns.

Trafalgar

Rayo was dismasted as a result of damage sustained in the battle. A few days later, Rayo went to sea in an attempt to recapture prizes taken by the British. With a British prize crew aboard, she ran aground in the storm of 26 October and was wrecked. Her broken hull was set ablaze and destroyed by British sailors on 31 October.

References

External links 
 Website on Trafalgar
 Diving expedition on the wreck of the Rayo

Rayo
1749 ships
Ships built in Cuba
Maritime incidents in 1805
Shipwrecks of Spain